John Curtis Iffert (born November 23, 1967) is an American prelate of the Roman Catholic Church who has been serving as bishop for the Diocese of Covington in Kentucky since 2021.

Biography

Early life 
John Iffert  was born in Du Quoin, Illinois on November 23, 1967.  He studied at Illinois State University in Normal, Illinois, where he earned a Bachelor of  Political Science degree in 1988. He then entered Mundelein Seminary in Mundelein, Illinois where he earned a Bachelor of Sacred Theology degree in 1996 and a Master of Divinity degree in 1997.

Priesthood 
On June 7, 1997, Iffert was ordained to the priesthood for the Diocese of Belleville by then Archbishop Wilton Gregory.In 1997, Iffert's first assignment was as the parish vicar of the Cathedral of St. Peter Parish in Belleville, Illinois. In 2000, Iffert became the parish priest of  Immaculate Conception Parish in Columbia, Illinois. In 2003, he became a member of the Order of Preachers, giving his first vows in 2004. Iffert served as parish vicar of the St. Thomas Aquinas Catholic Center at Purdue University.

Iffert was administrator of St. Mary Immaculate Conception in Mt. Vernon, Illinois, from 2008 to 2010, administrator of St. Theresa of Avila Parish in Salem, Illinois, and St. Elizabeth Ann Seton Parish in Kinmundy, Illinois from 2009 to 2010, pastor of St. Mary from 2010 to 2020 and pastor of St. Barbara Parish in Scheller, Illinois, from 2014 to 2020. In 2020, Iffert was named vicar general for the Diocese of Belleville and pastor of St. Stephen in Caseyville, Illinois.

Bishop of Covington 
On July 13, 2021, Pope Francis appointed Iffert as the eleventh bishop for the Diocese of Covington . On September 30, 2021, he was consecrated by Archbishop Joseph  Kurtz at the Cathedral Basilica of the Assumption in Covington.

See also

 Catholic Church hierarchy
 Catholic Church in the United States
 Historical list of the Catholic bishops of the United States
 List of Catholic bishops of the United States
 Lists of patriarchs, archbishops, and bishops

External links 
https://www.bnd.com/news/local/article252756838.html#storylink=cpy

References

External links
Roman Catholic Diocese of Covington Official Site 
Roman Catholic Diocese of Belleville Official Site

Episcopal succession

  
 

1967 births 
Living people
American Roman Catholic priests
Bishops appointed by Pope Francis